Presenting Cannonball is the 1955 debut album by jazz saxophonist Cannonball Adderley, released on the Savoy label, featuring a quintet with Nat Adderley, Hank Jones, Paul Chambers, and Kenny Clarke. A 1994 Japanese CD release also included alternate takes of tracks from Adderley's recording debut previously released as Kenny Clarke's Bohemia After Dark (1955).

Reception

The Billboard review in 1955 stated: "This is strong, vibrant, swinging jazz of the moderate-modern school." The Penguin Guide to Jazz states: "Everything was already in place at the time of his 1955 debut with brother Nat playing the eternal second fiddle". The AllMusic review by Scott Yanow states: "Already at this early stage, Adderley was a powerful player with a soulful sound that was almost distinctive."

Track listing
All compositions by Julian "Cannonball" Adderley except where noted.
 "Spontaneous Combustion" - 10:06
 "Still Talkin' to Ya" - 8:58
 "A Little Taste" - 5:06
 "Caribbean Cutie" - 7:06
 "Flamingo" (Ted Grouya, Edmund Anderson) - 7:06
 "With Apologies to Oscar" (Julian "Cannonball" Adderley, Nat Adderley) - 5:42 Bonus track on CD
 "Late Entry" (Adderley, Adderley) - 3:16 Bonus track on CD
 "Bohemia After Dark" (Oscar Pettiford) - 6:03 Bonus track on CD
 "With Apologies to Oscar" [alternate take] (Julian "Cannonball" Adderley, Nat Adderley) - 5:42 Bonus track on CD
 "A Little Taste" [alternate take] - 5:15 Bonus track on CD
 "Bohemia After Dark" [alternate take] (Pettiford) - 5:45 Bonus track on CD
Recorded on June 28 (tracks 6-9 & 11), and July 14 (tracks 1-5 & 10), 1955

Personnel
Cannonball Adderley - alto saxophone
Nat Adderley – cornet (tracks 1-4 & 6-11)
Donald Byrd - trumpet (tracks 6, 8-9 & 11)
Jerome Richardson - tenor saxophone, flute (tracks 6-9 & 11)
Horace Silver -  piano (tracks 6-9 & 11)
Hank Jones - piano (tracks 1-5 & 10)
Kenny Clarke - drums
Paul Chambers - bass

References

1955 debut albums
Savoy Records albums
Albums produced by Ozzie Cadena
Cannonball Adderley albums
Albums recorded at Van Gelder Studio